The K-class submarines were a class of eight submarines of the United States Navy, serving between 1914 and 1923, including World War I. They were designed by Electric Boat and were built by other yards under subcontracts. K-1, K-2, K-5, and K-6 were built by Fore River Shipyard in Quincy, Massachusetts, K-3, K-7, and K-8 by Union Iron Works in San Francisco, and K-4 by The Moran Company in Seattle, Washington. All were decommissioned in 1923 and scrapped in 1931 to comply with the limits of the London Naval Treaty.

Service
K-1, K-2, K-5, and K-6 began their careers on the US East Coast and were forward deployed to the Azores in World War I as convoy escorts, where their experience proved valuable in adapting future submarines for surfaced operations in rough weather. The remaining four were stationed on the West Coast early in their careers, but were reassigned to Key West, Florida for training and coastal security patrols in early 1918. All remained on the East Coast following the war for the rest of their careers.

Design
The K class, although similar to the preceding H class, were slightly larger. These vessels included some features intended to increase underwater speed that were standard on US submarines of this era, including a rotating cap over the torpedo tube muzzles. A small sail for extended surface runs was augmented with a temporary piping-and-canvas structure.

Apparently the "crash dive" concept had not yet been thought of, as this would take considerable time to deploy and dismantle. This remained standard through the N class, commissioned 1917-1918. Experience in World War I showed that this was inadequate in the North Atlantic weather, and earlier submarines serving overseas in that war (E class through L class, including four of the K class) had their bridge structures augmented with a "chariot" shield on the front of the bridge. Starting with the N class, built with lessons learned from overseas experience, US submarines had bridges more suited to surfaced operations in rough weather.

The K class eliminated the streamlined, rotating torpedo tube muzzle cap which was standard on previous classes. The muzzle cap was replaced with shutters that were standard through the 1950s.

Boats in class
The first four were renamed K-1 through K-4 on 17 November 1911 as part of a forcewide redesignation of US submarines.
  (formerly USS Haddock) was laid down on 20 February 1912, launched on 3 September 1913 and commissioned on 17 March 1914. The submarine was decommissioned on 7 March 1923 and scrapped in 1931.
  (formerly USS Cachalot) was laid down on 20 February 1912, launched on 4 October 1913 and commissioned on 31 January 1914. The submarine was decommissioned on 9 March 1923 and scrapped in 1931.
  (formerly USS Orca) was laid down on 15 January 1912, launched on 14 March 1914 and commissioned on 30 October 1914. The submarine was decommissioned on 20 February 1923 and scrapped in 1931.
  (formerly USS Walrus) was laid down on 27 January 1912, launched on 19 March 1914 and commissioned on 24 October 1914. The submarine was decommissioned on 10 May 1923 and scrapped in 1931.
  was laid down on 10 June 1912, launched on 17 March 1914 and commissioned on 22 August 1914. The submarine was decommissioned on 20 February 1923 and scrapped in 1931.
  was laid down on 19 June 1912, launched on 26 March 1914 and commissioned on 9 September 1914. The submarine was decommissioned on 21 May 1923 and scrapped in 1931.
  was laid down on 10 May 1912, launched on 20 June 1914 and commissioned on 1 December 1914. The submarine was decommissioned on 12 February 1923 and scrapped in 1931.
  was laid down on 10 May 1912, launched on 11 July 1914 and commissioned on 1 December 1914. The submarine was decommissioned on 24 February 1923 and scrapped in 1931.

References

Notes

Sources
 Gardiner, Robert, Conway's All the World's Fighting Ships 1906–1921 Conway Maritime Press, 1985. .
 Friedman, Norman "US Submarines through 1945: An Illustrated Design History", Naval Institute Press, Annapolis:1995, .
Navsource.org early diesel submarines page
Pigboats.com K-boats page

External links

Submarine classes
 
 K class